William Ray Upton (June 18, 1929 – January 2, 1987) was a Major League Baseball pitcher who made two relief appearances in  with the Philadelphia Athletics. He batted and threw right-handed.

Upton had no decision in either of his appearances, with a 1.80 ERA, allowing one earned run in five innings pitched.

He was born in Esther, Missouri and died in San Diego, California. His brother Tom played in the big leagues from 1950 to 1952.

External links

1929 births
1987 deaths
Ada Herefords players
Ardmore Indians players
Baseball players from Missouri
Columbia Reds players
Indianapolis Indians players
Iola Indians players
Jacksonville Braves players
Major League Baseball pitchers
Minot Mallards players
Nashville Vols players
Oakland Oaks (baseball) players
Oklahoma City Indians players
Ottawa A's players
People from Park Hills, Missouri
Philadelphia Athletics players
Savannah Redlegs players
Spartanburg Peaches players
Tulsa Oilers (baseball) players